Tuscarawas Central Catholic Junior/Senior High School is a private, Catholic high school in New Philadelphia, Ohio, United States. It is one of eleven secondary schools operated under the direction of the Roman Catholic Diocese of Columbus. Athletic teams compete as the Tuscarawas Central Catholic Saints in the Ohio High School Athletic Association as a member of the Inter-Valley Conference.

History
Tuscarawas Central Catholic was formed in 1970 by the merger of St. Mary High School in Dennison and St. Joseph High School in Dover.

OHSAA state championships

 Boys' golf – 1975

References

External links
 School Website

Roman Catholic Diocese of Columbus
High schools in Tuscarawas County, Ohio
Catholic secondary schools in Ohio
Educational institutions established in 1970